Bebearia demetra, the grey forester, is a butterfly in the family Nymphalidae. It is found in Guinea, Sierra Leone, Liberia, Ivory Coast, Ghana, Togo, Nigeria, Cameroon, Gabon and the Central African Republic. The habitat consists of wet forests.

Subspecies
Bebearia demetra demetra (Guinea, Sierra Leone, Liberia, Ivory Coast, Ghana, Togo, western Nigeria)
Bebearia demetra obsolescens (Talbot, 1928) (Cameroon, Gabon, Central African Republic)

References

Butterflies described in 1824
demetra